Andrew Bilesky is a Canadian curler from New Westminster, British Columbia.

Career
Bilesky has skipped teams on the World Curling Tour since the 2009–10 curling season. His best finish to date is as champion at the 2011 Kamloops Crown of Curling.

Bilesky won his first Men’s provincial curling championship in 2013 after defeating Brent Pierce in the final. He went on to represent British Columbia at the Brier for the first time, finishing tied for last place with a 1–10 win–loss record.

Bilesky also won the 2001 BC Junior curling championship to represent British Columbia at the Canadian Juniors finishing with a 5-7 record.

References

External links
 

Living people
Curlers from British Columbia
Year of birth missing (living people)
People from New Westminster